Moortown is a rural area in the north east of County Tyrone, Northern Ireland. It lies on the western shores of Lough Neagh, beside Ballinderry and Ardboe. It is relatively close to the towns of Cookstown, Magherafelt and Dungannon. It is in Mid Ulster District Council area. Places of interest include Kinturk Cultural Centre, Coyles Cottage, the Aerodrome, the Battery Harbour and the Ardboe High Cross.

Sport 
Gaelic football is the main sport of the area, with Moortown St Malachy's GAC being the local club. Moortown are currently a senior team. Moortown won the county championship in 1992. Chris Lawn won two All-Ireland medals with the Tyrone county team. The home pitch was Tobin Park but has now relocated to an adjacent new leisure complex at Aneter Road. Moortown had a very successful hurling club formed by Master Tom Magner around 1960 which competed in the Tyrone league and later in the South Derry and Armagh leagues. Several Moortown hurlers represented County Tyrone at both minor and senior hurling level during the 1960s and 1970s. A camogie team existed in Moortown during the 1950s. A new camogie team has recently been set up. The mens senior team is now Captained by Patsy Ryans dog Sam, an acquaintance of Sean Paul Quinn of Farsnagh

References

Villages in County Tyrone